Krombia djergiralis is a moth in the family Crambidae. It is found in North Africa.

References

Cybalomiinae
Moths described in 1911